Amy Thomas (born 2 September 2000) is an Australian handball player for UTS-UC Hawks and the Australian national team.

She represented Australia at the 2019 World Women's Handball Championship in Japan, where the Australian team placed 24th.

References

Australian female handball players
2000 births
Living people